Bollepalli is a village in Yadadri Bhuvanagiri district of Telangana, India. It falls under Bhongir mandal.

Notable people
Ravi Narayana Reddy was born and brought up in this village. He was a freedom fighter, philanthropist, social reformer and parliamentarian.

References

Villages in Nalgonda district